Kus Bani Koshur Karorpaet is an Indian Kashmiri-language television game show based on Kaun Banega Crorepati. It premiered on 29 April 2019. It had its finale episode aired on 6 July 2019. It is hosted by Rayees Mohiuddin. The show is broadcast on Doordarshan Kashir. On 3 July 2019, muppets Chamki and Grover from the Indian adaptation of Sesame Street, Galli Galli Sim Sim which airs on national sister channel Doordarshan National, made a crossover appearance in the 56th episode of the show by speaking in Hinglish.

See also 
Doordarshan
Prasar Bharati
Kashmiri cinema
Jammu and Kashmir

Notes and references

External links 
 
 

Who Wants to Be a Millionaire?
2019 Indian television series debuts
Kashmiri-language mass media
Indian game shows
Indian reality television series
Doordarshan original programming
Indian television series based on British television series